Gino DiMare (born July 21, 1969) is the head baseball coach for the Miami Hurricanes baseball team at the University of Miami. DiMare played college baseball at the University of Miami under head coach Ron Fraser from 1989 to 1992 before pursuing a professional career. 

DiMare began his head coaching career with the Hurricanes in 2019 after taking over for retiring head coach Jim Morris following the 2018 season.

DiMare previously spent 19 seasons as an assistant coach for the Hurricanes.

Head coaching record

References

External links
 Official profile
 Baseball Reference

Living people
1969 births
Miami Hurricanes baseball coaches
Baseball outfielders
Miami Hurricanes baseball players
Winter Haven Red Sox players
Fort Lauderdale Red Sox players
Sports coaches from Miami
Baseball players from Miami
Gulf Coast Red Sox players